Czesław Ryll-Nardzewski (7 October 1926 – 18 September 2015) was a Polish mathematician.

Born in Wilno, Second Polish Republic (now Vilnius, Lithuania), he was a student of Hugo Steinhaus. At the age of 26 he became professor at Warsaw University. In 1959, he became a professor at the Wrocław University of Technology. He was the advisor of 18 PhD theses. His main research areas are measure theory, functional analysis, foundations of mathematics and probability theory. Several theorems bear his name: the Ryll-Nardzewski fixed point theorem, the Ryll-Nardzewski theorem in model theory, and the Kuratowski and Ryll-Nardzewski measurable selection theorem.

He became a member of the Polish Academy of Sciences in 1967. He died in 2015 at the age of 88 and he is buried in the Wrocław, cm. Grabiszyński.

References

 Short biography at the Polish Academy of Sciences

1926 births
2015 deaths
Model theorists
Scientists from Vilnius
People from Wilno Voivodeship (1926–1939)
Polish mathematicians
Recipients of the State Award Badge (Poland)